Chromocyphella is a genus of fungi in the family Hymenogastraceae. The genus is widespread and contains six species.

See also
Chromocyphella muscicola

References

Agaricales
Agaricales genera